Noel Mwandila (born 28 December 1982) is a retired Zambian football midfielder.

References

1982 births
Living people
Zambian footballers
Zambia international footballers
Green Buffaloes F.C. players
Winners Park F.C. players
Association football midfielders
Zambian expatriate footballers
Expatriate soccer players in South Africa
Zambian expatriate sportspeople in South Africa